The House of Croce or Kručić was a noble family in the Republic of Ragusa, based in Dubrovnik. Some of its representatives were state officials and the family is considered to be among the ten richest families of the Republic in the 14th century.

History 
There are very few reliable data on the family's early history. The first known mention appears in the 13th century. During the 14th century members of the family took part in land/estate allocations of newly acquired territories: in Pelješac (1333), in upper parts of Astarea (1366), and in Dubrovačko Primorje (1399) northwest from the city.

From 1440 to 1640, there were in total 10 members of the family who entered the Grand Council (Consilium maius), a body consisting of all adult Ragusan noblemen. Two of them were elected to the Senate (Consilium rogatorum), and a single one as "rector" (or knez) of the Republic, the head of the state.

In the beginning of the 15th century Ragusan nobility were present in Novo Brdo as merchants or mining lords; Croce were also present.

Although small and not branchy, gradually losing its wealth and influence, the family still persisted until the 18th century, when its last descendant died.

The most notable member of the family was Joannes de Cruce (Ivan Kručić), a Ragusan Dominican who became bishop of Ston (and later bishop of Korčula) at the end of the 13th and the beginning of the 14th century.

References

External links
 House of Kručić – one of the 33 Ragusan noble families in the 15th century (Filip de Diversis: Description of the famous city of Dubrovnik)
 Participation of the House of Kručić in power (1440-1640)
 List of bishops of Ston
 Ivan Kručić became bishop of Korčula in 1300

Ragusan noble families